The Dallas Baptist Patriots are the 15 athletic teams that represent the Dallas Baptist University, located in Dallas, Texas, in NCAA intercollegiate sports. All of the varsity Patriot athletic teams compete at the Division II level with the exception of the baseball team, which plays in Division I. DBU Athletics also sponsors five club programs including; cheer, dance, bass fishing, lacrosse, and ice hockey. As such, all athletic teams, except for baseball, compete in the Lone Star Conference while the baseball program is an associate member of Conference USA. All intercollegiate athletic teams also hold membership in the National Christian College Athletic Association (NCCAA).

Athletic program
The school's athletic department features a Christ-centered discipleship program, as a part of the mission to develop "Champions for Christ". DBU athletics also launched the Global Sports Mission Initiative in 2007 to allow student-athletes the opportunity to share the love of Christ, while using their God-given athletic talents and gifts to minister and spread the Word of God abroad. The Global Sports Mission Initiative was created as a vision by Patriot athletics and the DBU Global Missions Department and has included trips to Guatemala, Peru, Dominican Republic, South Korea, England, Brazil, Chile, Liberia, Scotland, China, Honduras, and Curacao, with plans for more trips in the near future.

Over the last several years, facility additions have been made to the athletic department, including the construction of the Sadler Patriot Clubhouse, Patriot Athletic Guesthouse, Sedwick Soccer Fieldhouse, Joan and Andy Horner Ballpark, and the Athletic Training Center.

Varsity teams

Dallas Baptist University sponsors teams in seven men's and six women's NCAA sanctioned sports, as well as five club sports. 

# - The baseball team competes in Division I as an affiliate member of Conference USA.

References

External links